Sittingbourne and Sheppey is a constituency in Kent represented in the House of Commons of the UK Parliament since 2010 by Gordon Henderson, a Conservative.

Boundaries
1997–2010: The Borough of Swale wards of Borden, Eastern, Grove, Hartlip and Upchurch, Iwade and Lower Halstow, Kemsley, Milton Regis, Minster Cliffs, Murston, Newington, Queenborough and Halfway, Roman, Sheerness East, Sheerness West, Sheppey Central, West Downs, Woodstock.

2010–2015: The Borough of Swale wards of Borden, Chalkwell, Grove, Hartlip, Newington and Upchurch, Iwade and Lower Halstow, Kemsley, Leysdown and Warden, Milton Regis, Minster Cliffs, Murston, Queenborough and Halfway, Roman, St Michael's, Sheerness East, Sheerness West, Sheppey Central, Teynham and Lynsted, West Downs, Woodstock.

2015–present: The Borough of Swale wards of Bobbing, Iwade and Lower Halstow, Borden and Grove Park, Chalkwell, Hartlip, Newington and Upchurch, Homewood, Kemsley, Milton Regis, Minster Cliffs, Murston, Queenborough and Halfway, Roman, Sheerness, Sheppey Central, Sheppey East, Teynham and Lynsted, The Meads, West Downs, Woodstock.

The constituency was created in 1997, mostly from the former seat of Faversham. It covers some of the district of Swale, including Sittingbourne and the Isle of Sheppey.

Constituency profile

The seat includes the industrial town of Sittingbourne, the port of Sheerness, as well as significant areas of natural conservation. Some of the traditional fruit-growing sector remains in this part of North Kent. Residents voted strongly for Leave in the 2016 EU referendum, and are slightly poorer and less healthy than the UK average.

History
The constituency has been a bellwether of the national result since its creation in 1997. The seat came extremely close to losing this status in the 2005 general election, when Labour held the seat by just 79 votes after a recount, even though the sitting MP, Derek Wyatt, was expecting to lose.

Boundary changes which came into effect for the 2010 general election suggest that the Conservatives would have won the seat in 2005 on the new boundaries, though the estimated notional Conservative majority is extremely small, so that it could have gone either way.

Members of Parliament

Elections

Elections in the 2010s

Elections in the 2000s

Elections in the 1990s

See also
List of parliamentary constituencies in Kent

Notes

References

Parliamentary constituencies in Kent
Politics of Swale
Constituencies of the Parliament of the United Kingdom established in 1997